People's Republic of China – Egypt relations were  established  on May 30, 1956.

History
Fatimid Caliph Al-Hakim bi-Amr Allah sent a delegation to Song dynasty China led by Domiyat.

The Mamluk Sultan of Egypt ordered Jidda to treat Chinese traders honorably upon their arrival in the early 15th century.

Yusuf Ma Dexin visited Egypt in the 1840s.

The Republic of China (1912–49) sent Hui Muslims like Muhammad Ma Jian and other Hui Muslim students to study at Al-Azhar in Egypt. The Fuad Muslim Library in China was named after Fuad I of Egypt by the Chinese Muslim Ma Songting.

Imam Wang Jingzhai studied at Al-Azhar University in Egypt along with several other Chinese Muslim students, the first Chinese students in modern times to study in the Middle East. Wang recalled his experience teaching at madrassas in the provinces of Henan (Yu), Hebei (Ji), and Shandong (Lu) which were outside of the traditional stronghold of Muslim education in northwest China, and where the living conditions were poorer and the students had a much tougher time than the northwestern students. In 1931 China sent five students to study at Al-Azhar in Egypt, among them was Muhammad Ma Jian and they were the first Chinese to study at Al-Azhar. Na Zhong, a descendant of Nasr al-Din (Yunnan) was another one of the students sent to Al-Azhar in 1931, along with Zhang Ziren, Ma Jian, and Lin Zhongming.

A False Hadith(), a saying of the prophet Muhammad, spread to China, which says "Loving your country is part of loving the Faith". It is not a real Hadith but was a popular slogan among Arabic speakers in Middle East in the 19th-20th centuries. It spread to China via Hui Muslim students like Muhammad Ma Jian who studied at Al-Azhar in Egypt.

Hui Muslim General Ma Bufang and his retinue including Ma Chengxiang moved to Egypt before being appointed as ambassador to Saudi Arabia.

Chinese Premier Zhou Enlai first met Egyptian President Gamal Abdel Nasser at the Asian-African Conference in Bandung. In May 1956, Nasser defied U.S. pressure and displeasure by recognizing People's Republic of China. Zhou visited Egypt three times during his tenure. During the Suez War, on 3 November 1956, China supported Egypt's bid to take back control of the Suez Canal, 250,000 Chinese reportedly registered to serve as “volunteers” in Egypt.

In the aftermath of the Yom Kippur War, China provided Egypt with economic aid and food aid (100.000 tons of cereals) and military equipment. Egyptian government maintained cordial relations with the China even after Nasser's successor, Anwar Sadat, broke with the USSR in favor of a partnership with the U.S., Hosni Mubarak first visited China in 1976 as vice president, during which he was received by Mao Zedong and provision of spare parts for Egypt's Soviet‐supplied Tupolev bombers and MIG fighters.

In 1971 Egypt supported China's bid for a permanent seat in the United Nations and it voted in favour to admit Beijing and replace Taipei.

In 2012, Egyptian president Mohamed Morsi chose China for his first official visit outside the Middle East.

Military
1970–80s, China delivered B-6 bomber and F-6 fighter to Cairo and received several MiG-23 from Egypt. 
Egyptian navy received ships in the 1980s from China including submarines and frigates. China has also helped Egypt develop its own missile systems.

The K-8E is an Egyptian variant of the Chinese Hongdu JL-8, exported as the Karakorum-8 (or K-8) to (among others) Pakistan, Zambia and Myanmar.  The K-8E's manufacture at the Arab Organization for Industrialization (AOI) Aircraft Factory began in 2000, under an agreement between the AOI and CATIC, the Chinese state-owned aerospace manufacturer, to produce a total of 60 K-8s over five years.  The contract, valued at US$347.4 million, was signed in 1999 in connection with the state visit by Chinese president Jiang Zemin that year.  Initially, most of the parts were manufactured in China and the aircraft were assembled in Egypt, but by the end of the programme the manufacture was to be carried out entirely at the AOI Aircraft Factory.  It is located in Helwan. In May 2012 six Egyptian drones of ASN-209 was built in collaboration with a Chinese defence manufacturer during the first phase and are fully operational under the Egyptian armed forces according to Hamdy Weheba,

China and Egypt held first joint naval drills in June 2015.

In 2018, the Egyptian air force revealed they were operating Chinese-made CAIG Wing Loong drones.

Economic relations 

Bilateral trade reached about $4 billion U.S. dollars in 2007, up from $3.19b in 2006. In 2010, it was worth US$7.0 billion. In 2011 Egypt was the 5th largest trading partner of China in Africa and in the first 8 months of 2012 it was the 4th.

From 2000 to 2012, there are approximately 39 Chinese official development finance projects identified in Egypt through various media reports. These projects range from jointly constructing an industrial park in the Northwest Suez Economic Zone beginning June 1, 2000, to the construction of a Chinese language school in Cairo in 2002 through a US$4 million grant from the Chinese government.
In 2016, Egyptian president Elsisi made a visit to China and signed a number of deals there including New Administrative Capital of Egypt.

In November 2020, Egypt and China signed a protocol of cooperation to utilise and market a land plot owned by the Suez Canal Authority in Ain Sokhna.

Human rights
In July 2019, UN ambassadors of 37 countries, including Egypt, have signed a joint letter to the UNHRC defending China's treatment of Uyghurs and other Muslim minority groups in the Xinjiang region. Western media outlets reported that Egypt had aided in deporting Uyghurs to China; however, in July 2017, Al-Azhar, Egypt's leading Islamic institution, denied that any Uyghurs had been arrested from within its campus or other buildings belonging to the organization itself.

In June 2020, Egypt was one of 53 countries that backed a statement supporting the Hong Kong national security law at the United Nations.

Education 
Peking University has a long history of friendly cooperation with Cairo University. As early as 1986, the two universities signed an inter-school exchange agreement, after which they have completed the renewal of the Inter-school cooperation Agreement in year 2000. On 29 December 2007, the two sides signed an implementary agreement of establishing Confucius Institute through cooperation, and held a grand opening ceremony for the new institute, which had the honor of the attendance of Mr. Wu Chunhua Chinese Ambassador in Egypt, Mr. Ali Abd el-Rahman Yousef President of Cairo University, Mr. Zhang Guoyou Vice President of Peking University and other leaders. On 18 March 2008, the Confucius Institute in Cairo University---the first Confucius Institute established both in Egypt and North Africa—started its recruitment and Chinese language courses.

See also 
 List of ambassadors of China to Egypt

Bibliography

References

External links
Embassy of the People's Republic of China in the Arab Republic of Egypt

 
Egypt
Bilateral relations of Egypt
Egypt